N is the fourteenth letter of the Latin alphabet.

N or n may also refer to:

Mathematics 
 , the set of natural numbers
 N, the field norm
 N for nullae, a rare Roman numeral for zero
 n, the size of a statistical sample

Science 
 N for Newton (unit), the SI derived unit of force
 Nitrogen, symbol N, a chemical element
 N or Asn, the symbol for the common natural amino acid asparagine
 N, the Normality (chemistry) or chemical concentration of a solution 
 N, the neutron number, the number of neutrons in a nuclide
 N, in Brillouin zone, the center of a face of a body-centered cubic lattice
 n, for nano-, prefix in the SI system of units denoting a factor of 10−9
 n, the optical refractive index of a material
 n, the principal quantum number, the first of a set of quantum numbers of an atomic orbital
 n, an electron density, the measure of the probability of an electron being present at a specific location
 n, an amount of substance in chemical physics
 n, the coordination number of a substance
 n-, a lowercase prefix in chemistry denoting the straight-chain form of an open-chain compound in contrast to its branched isomer
 N-, an uppercase prefix in chemistry denoting that the substituent is bonded to the nitrogen, as in amines
 ATC code N Nervous system, a section of the Anatomical Therapeutic Chemical Classification System
 Haplogroup N (mtDNA), a human mitochondrial DNA haplogroup
 Haplogroup N (Y-DNA), a human Y-chromosome DNA haplogroup
 N band, an atmospheric transmission window in the mid-infrared centred on 10 micrometres
 N ray, a hypothesized form of radiation, found to be illusory
N., abbreviation of the Latin word nervus meaning nerve, used in anatomy, e.g. N. vagus

Engineering 
 N, in geotechnical engineering, the result of a standard penetration test
 N, in electrical systems, the connection to neutral
 N, an ITU prefix allocated to the United States for radio and television stations
 n (Poland), a digital TV platform
 N battery or N cell, a standard size of dry cell battery
 N connector, a threaded RF connector for joining coaxial cables

Entertainment 
 N. (novella), a 2008 short story by Stephen King
 Near (Death Note) (alias N), a character in the manga series Death Note
 N (video game), a 2005 computer game
 N (Pokémon), the leader and king of crime syndicate Team Plasma in the Pokémon franchise
 The N, a block on the Noggin TV channel
N, the production code for the 1965 Doctor Who serial The Web Planet
 "N" Is for Noose, the fourteenth novel in Sue Grafton's "Alphabet mystery" series, published in 1998

Music
 N (singer), stage name of Cha Hak-yeon, leader of the South Korean boy band VIXX
 N, an alias of Drew Mulholland, who recorded more often as Mount Vernon Arts Lab
 N (album), a 2008 album by Norther
 "N", a song by BanYa for the "Pump It Up: The Perfect Collection" music video game
 "n", a song by iamamiwhoami

Language 
 , the International Phonetic Alphabet symbol for a voiced alveolar nasal sound
 N (kana), a Japanese kana
 Noun, a part of speech

Other uses 
 N, North, one of the cardinal directions of the compass
 N postcode area, the part of the London post town covering part of North London, England
 ₦, the symbol for the Nigerian naira currency
 N, the code used to denote vehicle registration plates of Norway
 N (New York City Subway service), a service of the New York City Subway
 N Judah, a Muni Metro line in San Francisco, California
 N (Los Angeles Railway), a line operated by the Los Angeles Railway from 1920 to 1950
 N-class ferry, a class of small RORO ferry
 N scale or N gauge, a popular model railway size
 N, the identifier for the knight (chess) in algebraic notation
 November, the military time zone code for UTC−01:00

See also

Wolfsangel, a N/Z-shaped symbol
N class (disambiguation)
N road (disambiguation)
N type (disambiguation)
N-word (disambiguation)
n- (disambiguation) as a prefix
Ñ, a letter used in the Spanish and Filipino alphabets
И, a letter used in almost all Cyrillic alphabets